is a Japanese politician who currently serves as Minister for Foreign Affairs since November 2021. A member of the Liberal Democratic Party, he also serves in the House of Representatives for the Yamaguchi 3rd district since 2021.

Early life and education
A native of Shimonoseki, Hayashi is the son of late politician Yoshiro Hayashi. He graduated from the University of Tokyo and studied at Harvard Kennedy School at Harvard University.

Career

In the United States, he was a staffer for U.S. Representative Stephen L. Neal and U.S. Senator William V. Roth, Jr. He began his career with Mitsui & Co. Hayashi entered politics as a secretary to his father, Finance Minister Yoshiro Hayashi, in 1992. Around the same time, he was also the member of the policy staff for a US senator. Hayashi was elected to the House of Councillors for the first time in 1995. He represents the fourth generation of politicians in his family and has concentrated on administrative and tax reform since taking office. He is the great-grandson of Akira Tawarada, the founder of Ube Industries in 1942. This company made extensive use of American and Allied POW slave labor in three of their coal mines in Yamaguchi prefecture.

Hayashi was appointed to the Cabinet for the first time as Minister of Defense on 1 August 2008. He held this post for less than two months, however; in the Cabinet of Prime Minister Taro Aso, appointed on 24 September 2008, Hayashi was replaced by Yasukazu Hamada.

After the LDP returned to power in the December 2012 general election Hayashi was appointed Minister of Agriculture, Forestry and Fisheries.

On 6 November 2021, his appointment as the Minister for Foreign Affairs in the Second Kishida Cabinet was announced.

Hayashi was the first Japanese top diplomat to attend a NATO foreign ministers meeting in Brussels in April 2022.

Personal life
He likes karaoke and golf. He plays the guitar and keyboard with LDP colleagues in a band called .

References

External links
  in Japanese.

1961 births
Living people
Foreign ministers of Japan
Japanese defense ministers
Harvard Kennedy School alumni
Liberal Democratic Party (Japan) politicians
Members of the House of Councillors (Japan)
Ministers of Agriculture, Forestry and Fisheries of Japan
Mitsui & Co.
People from Shimonoseki
United States congressional aides
University of Tokyo alumni
Education ministers of Japan
Culture ministers of Japan
Science ministers of Japan
Sports ministers of Japan
Technology ministers of Japan